Heaven Lyan Salvador Peralejo (born November 25, 1999) is a Filipino actress and television personality known for joining the reality show Pinoy Big Brother: Lucky 7 in 2016.

After appearing in numerous TV shows in her home network, often having small roles, Peralejo’s breakout role came in October 2020 when she was cast as Joanna "Tisay" Magbanua / Joanna B. Veradona in the Philippine TV Series Bagong Umaga where she leads the cast along with Kiko Estrada, Michelle Vito, Yves Flores, Barbie Imperial, and Tony Labrusca. She was later nominated for a Best Actress award on the 35th PMPC Star Awards for Television for her performance on Bagong Umaga.

In July 2021, she starred in Maalaala Mo Kaya: Medalya episode, along with Iza Calzado and Shamaine Buencamino. Directed by Mae Cruz-Alviar, the episode later won the Best Single Drama/Telemovie/Anthology Episode for the 2021 Asian Academy Creative Awards.

In October 2022, she was cast on her first Metro Manila Film Festival movie, with Nanahimik ang Gabi, along with Ian Veneracion and Mon Confiado, it is one of the eight official entries of the 2022 Metro Manila Film Festival. Her performance on the film have earned Peralejo positive reviews and critical acclaims from movie goers and film critics, calling her acting as a “revelation”. She was later nominated for a Best Actress award on Metro Manila Film Festival Gabi ng Parangal, for her portrayal on the film.

Early life
Heaven Lyan Salvador Peralejo was born on November 25, 1999, in Makati, to Myk Manarang and Luanne Peralejo-Angeles. She is a niece of former actresses Rica Peralejo and Paula Peralejo.

Career
Peralejo's first television appearance was on GMA Network's Darna Liit audition in August 2009. She then appeared in an Autism Awareness commercial as her first television commercial appearance.

Peralejo appeared in small roles in 2014 for the tv series Home Sweetie Home as Isay and in 2015 for the movie Buy Now, Die Later as Cesska, prior to joining Pinoy Big Brother: Lucky 7 in 2016 where she came first to prominence.

In August 2016, Peralejo participated on the Philippine reality show Pinoy Big Brother: Lucky 7, with the moniker "Mommy's Angel ng Makati" due to her mother having cancer. She formed closed bond with her fellow teen housemates Marco Gallo and Edward Barber while inside the house. She took a voluntary exit on Day 72 due to her mother's diagnosis and upcoming surgery for brain cancer.

After her stint in Pinoy Big Brother: Lucky 7, Peralejo had a small role in Maalaala Mo Kaya: Karnabal episode as Ramon’s daughter.

Starting 2017 till present, she is a semi-regular performer on ASAP.

Her acting debut came when she joined Wansapanataym: Annika Pintasera episode in 2017.

In October of 2017, Peralejo was cast on the movie Bes and the Beshies as Betchay.

Peralejo had two more consecutive guestings for Maalaala Mo Kaya in 2017. In the episode titled 'Korona', she played as Angeline Aguilar and in the episode 'Tape Recorder', where she played as Jackelyn.

Towards the end of 2017 until 2018, Peralejo starred opposite Janella Salvador in Wansapanataym: Jasmin's Flower Powers episode.

In January 2018, Peralejo played Diwa for the movie Mama’s Girl, one of the friends of Sofia Andres character.

Her next acting project on 2018 came on Ipaglaban Mo: Hawig episode, her first stint on the show, where she played Rachel, the niece of Janice De Belen.

In August 2018, Peralejo played the role of Hershey for the movie Harry and Patty where she worked with Mark Neumann and Marco Gallo. 

In the same year, Peralejo starred in Sana Dalawa ang Puso as Sitti, the best friend of Ylona Garcia’s character.

She went on to play young Cara in Maalaala Mo Kaya: Fireworks episode in 2018.

She starred in another Ipaglaban Mo: Hadlang episode towards the end of 2018 where she played the girlfriend of the character of McCoy de Leon

Late in 2018 until early 2019, she starred opposite McCoy De Leon in Wansapanataym: Mr. Cutepido episode as DJ Tina. Directed by John Lapus, Peralejo was praised by Direk Lapus with her acting prowess on the episodes.

In April 2019, Peralejo played Marikit on the film Familia Blondina where she worked again with Marco Gallo.

In 2019, Peralejo starred in Maalaala Mo Kaya: Jacket as AJ, the adoptive daughter of Empoy and Jennica Garcia.

Peralejo joined Pamilya Ko in 2019 as Maria Corrine Patricia "Macopa" de Jesus opposite Kid Yambao’s character.

She had a small role in Ipaglaban Mo: Samantala episode as Jillian in 2019.

After doing guest performances in S.M.A.C. Pinoy Ito for IBC, on its 2nd season, Peralejo was promoted as series regular for the 3rd season of the show in 2019.

In 2019, her biggest break at that point on her career came when Peralejo played the teen version of Teresa for Judy Ann Santos-Agoncillo’s teleserye comeback, Starla. The young star said in multiple interviews that she idolise Judy Ann and said that it’s an honor to play her younger counter part.

In the same year, Peralejo’s first lead role in 'Maalaala Mo Kaya' is the Basketball Court episode where she played Tein, opposite Joshua Colet.

In 2019, her final episode for the debunked show 'Ipaglaban Mo!' is the Kutob episode where she played Meann, the granddaughter of the deceased victims.

From 2016 to 2019, Peralejo has appeared on numerous ABS-CBN programs including Minute to Win It, Family Feud, Tonight with Boy Abunda, It's Showtime, ASAP, Banana Sundae, Magandang Buhay and Matanglawin.

In 2020, her first lead role in a TV Series came when she replaced Julia Barretto after the latter transferred to Viva Artist Agency for the previously named project, Cara Y Cruz, now renamed as Bagong Umaga. She earned praises from her bosses; Direk Laurenti Dyogi and Cory Vidanes for her portrayal on the series.

She performed on Pinoy Big Brother: Connect: The Big Night with her batchmate on the show Vivoree Esclito among others.

In the same year, Peralejo played the biological daughter of Iza Calzado who is suffering from mental illness and Shamaine Buencamino, her teacher for Maalaala Mo Kaya: Medalya episode. It earned praises for the commendable acting prowess of the three leads and later won in Asian Academy Creative Awards.

In January 2021, she played the role of George for the movie Happy Times opposite Sharlene San Pedro and Ricci Rivero.

In December 2021, it was announced that Peralejo will star in The Fisher along with Enchong Dee, other castmembers includes Mon Confiado, Mercedez Cabral, and Eula Valdez and directed by Paul Soriano. 

In 2022, she joined the cast of A Family Affair as Victoria "Tori" Simbulan, the love interest of Jameson Blake’s character.

In October 2022, it was revealed that Peralejo was cast along with Ian Veneracion and Mon Confiado for the movie Nanahimik Ang Gabi. It was Peralejo’s first Metro Manila Film Festival movie entry. The film was shown in theaters in Christmas day of the same year where her portrayal of her character Me-Ann has been praised by film critics. Later on she was nominated for a Best Actress on 2022 Metro Manila Film Festival Gabi ng Parangal. 

In the same year, she had her final Maalaala Mo Kaya: Cake episode where she starred opposite Markus Patterson before the show’s eventual cancellation.

Early on 2023, she played as Daphne in the TV Series The Iron Heart she is the young apprentice of Diether Ocampo’s character.

In October 2022, Peralejo was revealed to be part of the cast of Linlang alongside Kim Chiu, Paulo Avelino, JM De Guzman, Jaime Fabregas and Maricel Soriano among others directed by Jojo Saguin and Manny Palo.

In November 2022, Peralejo alongside Marco Gallo were cast to play the titular roles of the live adaptation of The Rain in España directed by Theodore Boborol and produced by Viva Entertainment, the 10-part series will be available to stream in Viva One on April, 2023.

In January 2023, Peralejo is set to star in the movie Fruitcake alongside Joshua Garcia, Ria Atayde and Jane Oineza.

Personal life
Peralejo was in a relationship with Jinkee and Manny Pacquiao's son, Jimuel Pacquiao, until they broke up on August 7, 2019. She was also in a relationship with actor Kiko Estrada, but in October 2021 she confirmed that they are no longer together.

Peralejo graduated from Southville International School affiliated with Foreign Universities with a degree in business management.

Business venture
In 2022, Peralejo opened The Food Market, her own restaurant business that has branches in BGC and Alabang Westgate.

Filmography

Films

Television

Digital

Other Media

Discography

Singles

Awards and nominations

References

External links 
 

1999 births
Living people
Filipino female models
People from Makati
ABS-CBN personalities
Star Magic
Pinoy Big Brother contestants
Filipino child actresses
Filipino film actresses
Filipino television actresses
21st-century Filipino artists
21st-century Filipino singers
21st-century Filipino women singers
Star Music artists